Petrocephalus bane is a species of elephantfish native to Africa where it occurs in the basins of the Nile, Bénoué and Volta rivers and the Chad Basin.  It prefers relatively still waters of lakes, irrigation canals and lagoons.  This species can reach a length of  SL.  It can also be found in the aquarium trade.

References

Mormyridae
Weakly electric fish
Fish of Africa
Fish described in 1803